Dana Jurásková (born 21 September 1961) is a Czech politician. She was the Minister of Health in the caretaker government of Jan Fischer.

References

1961 births
Living people
Health ministers of the Czech Republic
People from Uherské Hradiště
Czech nurses
Civic Democratic Party (Czech Republic) Government ministers
Charles University alumni